Basque Canadians are Canadian citizens of Basque descent, or Basque people who were born in the Basque Country and reside in Canada. As of 2016, 6,965 people claimed Basque ancestry.

Basque sailors were whaling and fishing around Newfoundland beginning in 1525 and ending around 1626.

See also

 French Canadians
 Spanish Canadians
 Basque colonization of the Americas

References

Sources
Encyclopedia of Canada's Peoples. "Basques.". Multicultural Canada.

Further reading
  Examines the relationship between the Basques and the St. Lawrence Iroquoians.

 
Canada
European Canadian
French-Canadian people
Spanish Canadian